George W. Albright (born 1846) was a  farmer, educator, and politician who was born enslaved in the U.S. state of Mississippi. A Republican, Albright represented Marshall County in the Mississippi State Senate from 1874 to 1879 during the end of the Reconstruction Era. In 1873, Albright won his Senate seat by defeating the Democrat E. H. Crump, a leader in the Ku Klux Klan.

After he was emancipated from slavery, Albright worked as a field hand. His father, who was sold to an owner in Texas shortly before the American Civil War, joined the Union Army, and was killed at the Battle of Vicksburg in Mississippi. During the War, Albright was a member of the Union League, which promoted loyalty to the Republican Party and spread news of the Emancipation Proclamation among still enslaved people. After the war, he attended a school run by Sheriff Nelson Gill.

Albright married a white teacher and became a teacher himself. When he narrowly escaped with his life in a confrontation with Klansmen, Albright moved to Chicago, Kansas, and later Colorado. In 1937, in an interview with the communist Daily Worker newspaper, he hailed Communist Party USA for nominating a Black man, James W. Ford, for the vice-presidency in the 1936 presidential election.

In 2021, DeeDee Baldwin, a research librarian heading the Against All Odds archival history effort on African American legislators in Mississippi during and after the Reconstruction era and one of Albright's ancestors were part of a recorded talk and slide presentation.

See also
List of African-American officeholders during Reconstruction

References

1846 births
20th-century deaths
Year of death missing
African-American politicians during the Reconstruction Era
African-American state legislators in Mississippi
Schoolteachers from Mississippi
People from Marshall County, Mississippi
Republican Party Mississippi state senators
Victims of the Ku Klux Klan
19th-century American slaves
20th-century African-American politicians
African-American men in politics
20th-century American politicians
Ku Klux Klan in Mississippi